Muller Martini, based in Switzerland, manufactures paper inserting systems, mail room delivery systems, and other printing-related equipment. Manufacturing facilities are located in Switzerland, Germany, and the United States.

Switzerland started manufacturing bookbinding equipment in 1946 under the name Grapha Maschinenfabrik.  The first machine produced was a hand-fed saddle stitcher, later modernized by the “Swiss Girl” automatic feeder, which could be disengaged and tilted back when not in use.  Grapha exhibited its first fully automatic saddle stitcher with an in-line trimmer at Drupa in 1954.  During the same time, the company was working on the development of an adhesive binder.

In 1955, the company incorporated and changed its name to Grapha Maschinenfabrik Hans Müller A. G.  That same year Muller sold its first machine in the United States.  Other equipment was added, and in 1961 large-scale production of newspaper and magazine inserting machines was started.  As Muller expanded, new manufacturing, sales, and service facilities were set up abroad.  A United States subsidiary, the Hans Muller Corp. was established in 1967.

Martini joined the Muller organization in 1969.  Founded by Friedrich von Martini, inventor of a precision rifle, Martini began manufacturing folding and stitching machines in 1850.  Martini introduced its Book Sewing Machine in 1897, and more than 10,000 have been produced to date.  The Martini automobile, powered by a Martini-designed internal combustion engine, was also introduced in 1897.  Automobile production stopped in 1934, when the company decided to concentrate on book binding equipment.  Adhesive binding machines were developed by Martini in 1941.

Muller Martini developed its first offset web press for business forms in 1972 and is now a manufacturer of web presses for direct mail promotional graphics and commercial work. In 1973, Muller Martini USA offices relocated to Hauppauge, Long Island. At the same time, the company name was changed to Muller Martini Corp. A network of sales, product management, and service personnel were also established throughout the United States with Regional Offices in the Atlanta, Chicago, and San Francisco areas.

In the United States, Muller Martini started its first manufacturing facility in 1973 to produce bindery and mailroom equipment in Newport News, VA.

In 1989, Daverio in Switzerland and KJ in Denmark became part of the Muller Martini, with the ability to produce and market complete newspaper inserting, press finishing, and bindery systems, including conveyors and packaging lines for automatic production.

GMA, located in Allentown, Pennsylvania, a supplier of newspaper mailroom systems to the United States market, was acquired by the Muller Martini group of companies in 1992. GMA was renamed Muller Martini Mailroom Systems.

Muller Martini took over the manufacture of the VBF product line of case binding machines for hard cover book production in 1998. Manufacturing was moved to a new factory with its own training center in Bad Mergentheim, Germany, within 2 years. In 2007 VBF became Muller Martini Book Technology GmbH. As of January 2002, Muller Martini USA assumed marketing and customer service support for all VBF machines in the United States, along with casemakers made by Hoerauf.

In 2004 Muller Martini founded a new business segment "On Demand Solutions". The Division was developed to provide commercial quality finishing to the Digital Book Production market.

In 1991, Hans Müller Sr. transferred the overall responsibility of the Swiss-based company to his son Rudolf Müller, who now holds the position of CEO.

Products 

Saddle Stitching
Softcover Production
Hardcover Production
Mailroom Systems
Digital Solutions

Production facilities
Muller Martini has production facilities in Switzerland and  Germany.

Muller Martini Print Finishing Systems AG, Zofingen (Switzerland)
Muller Martini Electronic AG, Zofingen (Switzerland)  
Muller Martini Maschinen & Anlagen AG, Hasle and Stans (Switzerland) 
Muller Martini Book Technology GmbH, Bad Mergentheim (Germany)

See also
MAN Roland
Heidelberger Druckmaschinen

References

Bookbinding
Manufacturing companies of Switzerland
Printing press manufacturers
Manufacturing companies established in 1946
Swiss companies established in 1946
Swiss brands